Shetterly is a surname. Notable people with the surname include:

Caitlin Shetterly (born 1974), American writer and theatre director
Margot Lee Shetterly (born 1969), American non-fiction writer
Robert Shetterly (businessman) (1915-1997), American businessman
Robert Shetterly (born 1946), American artist
Will Shetterly (born 1955), American writer of fantasy and science fiction